Bubble Trouble may refer to:
 Bubble Trouble (film), a 1953 film
 Bubble Trouble (1987 video game), a 1987 video game for the Atari ST
 Bubble Trouble (1994 video game), a 1994 video game for the Atari Lynx
 Bubble Trouble: Golly! Ghost! 2, a 1992 arcade game
 Bubble Trouble (1996 video game), a 1996 video game for Mac
 Bubble Trouble, book by Margaret Mahy, illustrated by Polly Dunbar